The Advanced Strategic Air-Launched Missile (ASALM) was a medium-range strategic missile program, developed in the late 1970s for the United States Air Force. Intended for use in both the air-to-surface and anti-AWACS roles, the missile's development reached the stage of propulsion-system tests before being cancelled in 1980.

Design and development
Development of the Advanced Strategic Air-Launched Missile was initiated in 1976. The ASALM was intended to replace the AGM-69 SRAM in United States Air Force service, providing improved speed and range over the earlier missile, as well as improved performance against hardened targets. In addition, the requirement specified that the ASALM should be capable of operating in a secondary air-to-air mode against AWACS radar-warning aircraft. Martin Marietta and McDonnell Douglas submitted proposals for the contract, the former's design using a Marquardt propulsion system; the latter's, one developed by United Technologies Corporation; the Martin Marietta design was favored by the Air Force

The size of ASALM was limited by the requirement that it use the same launchers as the earlier SRAM. The missile would be steered by small fins at the tail, but lacked wings; the shape of the body combined with the high flight speed were to provide sufficient lift.

Guidance was planned to be provided during mid-course flight by an inertial navigation system, while terminal guidance would use a dual-mode seeker. Propulsion would be provided by an integrated rocket-ramjet, which would act as a solid-fuel rocket during boost, with the rocket's casing, following exhaustion of its propellant and the ejection of the rocket nozzle and a fairing covering an air inlet, becoming a combustion chamber for an air-breathing ramjet, which was planned to use Shelldyne-H fuel. The missile was expected to be carried by the B-1 bomber, or alternatively by a developed version of the FB-111.

Operational history

Starting in October 1979, a series of flight tests of Propulsion Technology Validation missiles, using a Marquardt rocket-ramjet, were conducted.

Despite the successful testing, the ASALM program was suspended following the seventh PTV test flight in May 1980; reductions in the defense budget, combined with the development of the subsonic AGM-86 ALCM, led to the cancellation of the program later that year.

The Martin Marietta ASALM concept was later developed into the AQM-127 SLAT target drone.

See also
 Air-Launched Cruise Missile
 BrahMos
 Creative Research On Weapons

References

Notes

Bibliography

 

Nuclear missiles of the United States
Air-to-surface missiles of the United States
Air-to-air missiles of the United States
Abandoned military rocket and missile projects of the United States